Yakkara, is an area in the city of Palakkad, Kerala, India. It is located approximately 4 kilometers from the city centre and is predominantly segregated as West Yakkara and East Yakkara.Government Medical College, Palakkad is located in East Yakkara.

It is said that in ancient times, Yagas were performed on the Banks of the River Shokanasini (Bharathapuzha). Thus the area came to be known as ‘Yaga-kara’ which later came to be known as ‘Yakkara’

Yakkara belongs to  Palakkad Assembly constituency in the Kerala Legislature. 

Shri Shafi Parambil of the Indian National Congress (INC) was elected as the Member of Legislative assembly from this constituency in 2021 Kerala Assembly elections. It is a part of the Palakkad Lok Sabha constituency, represented by Shri V K Sreekandan

Places of interest
Sree Vishveshwara temple is said to be founded by Sri Narayana Guru.  Thottingal family members provided land and the founder members were from Thottingal family. The Bharathapuzha river flows through the West Yakkara village and St Mary's Orthodox Syrian Church is situated on the DPO Road.

An Airport was proposed by government agencies to be located in Yakkara. The district administration had identified 60 acres of land for this purpose. The aim was that, the Airport will connect the district headquarters with international airports and major cities in the State.

References 

 
Suburbs of Palakkad
Cities and towns in Palakkad district